Chris Snyder is an American football coach and college athletics administrator.  He served as the head coach at Bethany College in Bethany, West Virginia from 2002 to 2003 and at Seton Hill University from 2005 to 2007.

Head coaching record

College

References

1961 births
Living people
American football offensive linemen
Alfred Saxons football coaches
Bethany Bison football coaches
Marietta Pioneers football coaches
Randolph–Macon Yellow Jackets football players
Seton Hill Griffins athletic directors
Seton Hill Griffins football coaches